The 1963 Oregon Webfoots represented the University of Oregon in the 1963 NCAA University Division football season. The Webfoots were an independent and outscored their opponents 274 to 153. Led by thirteenth-year head coach Len Casanova, the Ducks were 7–3 in the regular season and won the Sun Bowl over SMU on  Three home games were played on campus at Hayward Field in Eugene and three at Multnomah Stadium in Portland.

Notable players included Mel Renfro, Dave Wilcox, H.D. Murphy, and Bob Berry, all selected in the 1964 NFL Draft. Berry was a redshirt junior and played another season for Oregon in 1964. Renfro and Wilcox are members of the Pro Football Hall of Fame. Murphy was selected late and never played in the NFL; he played in the up-and-coming Continental Football League.

Following the disbandment of the Pacific Coast Conference, both Oregon and Oregon State were independent in football for five seasons, from 1959 through 1963. Both joined the AAWU (Pac-8) for the 1964 season.  The Pac-8 had bowl restrictions (Rose Bowl only) until 1975; the Ducks' next postseason appearance was at the 1989 Independence Bowl.

Schedule

The Civil War game was delayed a week following the assassination of President Kennedy.

Roster
QB Bob Berry, Jr.
FB Lu Bain, Sr.
HB Larry Hill, Sr.
  E  Dick Imwalle, Sr.
HB Dennis Keller, So.
HB H.D. Murphy, Sr.
HB Mel Renfro, Sr.
  E  Rich Schwab, Sr.
QB Jack Sovereign, So.
  G  Dave Wilcox, Sr.

NFL Draft
Four Oregon players were selected in the 1964 NFL Draft, which went twenty rounds (280 selections).

List of Oregon Ducks in the NFL draft

References

External links
 Game program: Oregon at Washington State – November 9, 1963
 WSU Libraries: Game video – Oregon at Washington State – November 9, 1963

Oregon
Oregon Ducks football seasons
Sun Bowl champion seasons
Oregon Webfoots football